Gregory Allen Grootboom (born 8 July 1954) is a retired South African politician and psychologist.

Biography
Grootboom was born in 1954. He started his student activism at the University of the Western Cape in 1973. He soon became involved with the Black Consciousness movement and joined the South African Students Organisation (SASO). He was also involved with the New Unity Movement and played a leading role in student politics.

Grootboom was a member of the African National Congress (ANC) until 1995 when he became a member of the Democratic Party (DP). The DP became the Democratic Alliance (DA) in 2000.

Grootboom briefly left politics to finish his studies and achieved an MEd in Psychology from the University of Port Elizabeth. He was also a Ford Fellow at the Ford Foundation. He later obtained a PhD in Psychology from the University of the Free State.

Grootboom returned to politics in 2009, as he became the leader and chairperson of the DA in the Northern Cape. He was sworn in as an MP in May 2009. He served as the DA's Shadow Deputy Minister for Arts and Culture.

Grootboom was elected to the Northern Cape Provincial Legislature in May 2019, but announced his withdrawal from politics a few months later in August. He resigned as an MPL in September and the DA appointed Sol Plaatje councillor Ofentse Mokae to succeed him.

References

External links
Mr Gregory Allen Grootboom – People's Assembly

Living people
1954 births
Democratic Alliance (South Africa) politicians
Members of the Northern Cape Provincial Legislature
Members of the National Assembly of South Africa
Democratic Party (South Africa) politicians
African National Congress politicians
20th-century South African politicians
21st-century South African politicians
University of the Western Cape alumni
University of the Free State alumni